Medio San Juan is a municipality and town in the Chocó Department, Colombia.

References

Municipalities of Chocó Department